The 2007–08 season was Burnley's 8th season in the second tier of English football. They were managed by Steve Cotterill in his fourth full season since he replaced Stan Ternent at the beginning of the 2004–05 season. He was sacked on 8 November 2007 after a poor run of results and replaced by Owen Coyle. Caretaker manager Steve Davis was put in charge of first team duties for the match against Leicester City on 10 November 2007.

Appearances and goals
Source:
Numbers in parentheses denote appearances as substitute.
Players with names struck through and marked  left the club during the playing season.
Players with names in italics and marked * were on loan from another club for the whole of their season with Burnley.
Players listed with no appearances have been in the matchday squad but only as unused substitutes.
Key to positions: GK – Goalkeeper; DF – Defender; MF – Midfielder; FW – Forward

Transfers

In

Out

Match details

Football League Championship

Final league position

FA Cup

Football League Cup

References

2007-08
2007–08 Football League Championship by team